Cuartel de Santo Domingo, also known as Fort Sto. Domingo and Intramuros of Sta. Rosa, is an old two-storey Spanish barracks building in Santa Rosa, Laguna in the Philippines. It is currently used as the headquarters of the Special Action Force of the Philippine National Police.

Profile 
The bastion is strategically located in Barangay Santo Domingo, Santa Rosa, Laguna near the municipality of Silang. It is named after Saint Dominic, a Dominican saint and founder of the Dominican order which owns the lands around Santa Rosa, Biñan and Calamba.

The whole cuartel is built across an  stretch of land. Its walls are made up of adobe stones. Some of the interior walls inside were part of the ruins of the old fort. Watchtowers are not presently used since the building is covered with huge trees.

History 
The fort was built in 1877 as headquarters of the guardia civil against tulisanes or bandits. Standing close to Silang, its adobe walls were built to protect the town, particularly the Dominican haciendas of Santa Rosa and Biñan, from tulisanes coming from Cavite. During the revolution, it served as headquarters of the Spaniards led by Gen. Jose Lachambre against the army of Gen. Emilio Aguinaldo from Cavite in 1897. The fort also served as a refuge for women from Cabuyao and Calamba to protect them from being abused by the Imperial Japanese Army and transformed as a center of commerce during the Japanese occupation. It was used by the Philippine Army from 1957 to 1990 and has been used by the Philippine National Police since 1992.

The Fort today 
The fort was declared a National Historical Landmark by the National Historic Institute (now National Historical Commission of the Philippines) under NHI Resolution No. 3, series 2005 on July 21, 2005. A marker was unveiled on September 20, 2005

Currently, the fort serves as the headquarters and training camp of the Philippine National Police's Special Action Force and as a detention center for many big-time political detainees such as former President Joseph Estrada, Moro National Liberation Front (MNLF) chair Nur Misuari, former Senator Gregorio Honasan and PDAF scam mastermind Janet Lim-Napoles. Since it now served as prisoners of high-profile detainees, the cuartel is off-limits to the public. The use of the fort as a detention facility was strongly opposed by Laguna's 1st District Representative Dan Fernandez.

The southwestern part of the fort was realigned to make way for the construction of the Santa Rosa City Exit of Cavite–Laguna Expressway.

Management 
Since 2000, the people of Santa Rosa through an organization called Kilusan Cuartel de Santo Domingo have "wanted to return the fort to the Local Government Unit of Santa Rosa from the ownership of the military and the police". Laguna 1st District Representative Dan Fernandez also appealed to Congress that the government unit owns it and not the military nor the police.''

References 

Marked Historical Structures of the Philippines
Spanish Colonial architecture in the Philippines
Forts in the Philippines
Spanish Colonial Fortifications of the Philippines
Buildings and structures completed in 1877
Buildings and structures in Santa Rosa, Laguna
National Historical Landmarks of the Philippines
1877 establishments in the Spanish Empire
19th-century architecture in the Philippines